This page lists the results of leadership elections held by the Nova Scotia New Democratic Party.  Though the party came into existence in 1961 with the merger of the Co-operative Commonwealth Federation and the Canadian Labour Congress, the position of party leader was not officially created until the 1966 convention. Outgoing CCF leader Michael James MacDonald led the party in the legislature until 1963. The party was led into the 1963 provincial election by party president 1963 until 1966  James H. Aitchison who served as de facto leader until 1966 when he was officially elected to the position of leader.

1963 leadership convention

(Held in November 1963)

James H. Aitchison presumably acclaimed

1968 leadership convention

(Held on November 9, 1968)

Jeremy Akerman 80
Keith Jobson 76

1980 leadership convention

(Held on November 16, 1980)

Alexa McDonough 237
Len J. Arsenault 42
Buddy MacEachern 41

1996 leadership convention

(Held on March 30, 1996)

Robert Chisholm 201
Yvonne Atwell 39

2000 leadership convention

(Held on July 15, 2000)

First Ballot:
Helen MacDonald 193
Kevin Deveaux 172
Maureen MacDonald 154
Dave Peters 47
Hinrich Bitter-Suermann 31

Second Ballot (Bitter-Suermann eliminated. Peters withdrew):
Kevin Deveaux 211
Helen MacDonald 207
Maureen MacDonald 177

Third Ballot (Maureen MacDonald eliminated):
Helen MacDonald 322
Kevin Deveaux 262

MacDonald was unable to gain election to the House of Assembly and resigned on April 30, 2001. Darrell Dexter was chosen interim leader.

2002 leadership convention

(Held on June 2, 2002)
Darrell Dexter 2,006
John MacDonell 1,181

2016 leadership convention

Was held on February 27, 2016 following the resignation of Darrell Dexter on November 16, 2013.

Candidates:

First ballot:
 Gary Burrill: 921 - 40.59%
 Lenore Zann: 705 - 31.07%
 Dave Wilson: 645 - 28.34%

Second ballot:
 Gary Burrill: 1343 - 59.19%
 Lenore Zann: 926 - 40.81%

2022 leadership convention

(To be held June 25, 2022)

The election will be conducted on a One Member One Vote basis.

References

Beck, J. Murray, Politics of Nova Scotia, vol.2. Four East Publications, 1988.
Carty, Kenneth R et al., Leaders and Parties in Canadian Politics: Experiences of the Provinces. Harcourt Brace Jovanovich Canada, 1992.
Stewart,Ian and Stewart, David K. "Conventional choices : Maritime leadership politics" University of British Columbia Press, 2007.

New Democratic Party
New Democratic Party provincial leadership elections